Cassinia rugata, commonly known as wrinkled dollybush, or wrinkled cassinia, is a species of flowering plant in the family Asteraceae and is endemic to south-eastern Australia. It is a spreading to erect shrub with hairy, slightly sticky branchlets, oblong to narrow elliptic leaves and corymbs of up to three hundred flower heads.

Description
The upper surface of the leaves is scaly or pimply, the edges rolled under and the lower surface densely covered with cottony hairs. Between 20 and 300 heads are arranged in corymbs  in diameter.

Taxonomy and naming
Cassinia rugata was first formally described in 1990 by Neville Grant Walsh in the journal Muelleria from specimens collected near Heathmere in 1988. The specific epithet (rugata) means "folded or wrinkled", referring to the inner involucral bracts.

Distribution
Cassinia rugata grows in swamps and on the edge of rivers in south-eastern South Australia, south-western Victoria and northern Tasmania. The species was only recognised as occurring in Tasmania in 2010, and is only reliably known from two private properties in that state.

Conservation status
This cassinia is listed as "vulnerable" under the Australian Government Environment Protection and Biodiversity Conservation Act 1999 and the Victorian Government Flora and Fauna Guarantee Act 1988 and as "endangered" under the Tasmanian Government Threatened Species Protection Act 1995.

References

rugata
Asterales of Australia
Flora of Victoria (Australia)
Flora of South Australia
Flora of Tasmania
Plants described in 1990
Taxa named by Neville Grant Walsh